Skyler Woodward (born May 7, 1993) is an American professional pool player. At the 2017 World Cup of Pool, he was the runner up, alongside Shane Van Boening. Woodward has represented the United States each year in the Mosconi Cup since the 2015 Mosconi Cup. At the 2018 and 2019 events Woodward was voted the Most Valuable Player.

His entrance walk-on music is "Rock and Roll" by Led Zeppelin.

Career titles & Achievements
 2022 Racks on the Rocks 9-Ball
 2022 Buffalo's Pro Classic 9-Ball 
 2022 Southeastern Triple Crown Bank Pool
 2021 Action Palace Open 8-Ball 
 2020 Music City Classic 9-Ball
 2019 Mosconi Cup (MVP) 
 2019 Mosconi Cup
 2019 ABN Dream Challenge Team USA vs. Russia 
 2019 Texas Open 9-Ball Championship 
 2019 CSI U.S. Open 8-Ball Championship 
 2019 Derby City Classic Master of the Table 
 2019 Derby City Classic 9-Ball
 2019 Derby City Classic Bank Pool Ring Game 
 2018 Mosconi Cup (MVP) 
 2018 Mosconi Cup
 2018 ABN Dream Challenge Team USA vs. Russia 
 2018 Midwest Bar Table Classic 9-Ball
 2017 Don Coates Memorial 10-Ball
 2017 World Pool Series RYO Rack Classic 
 2017 CSI US Bar Table 10-Ball Championship 
 2017 Music City Classic 9-Ball
 2016 Chinook Winds Open 8-Ball
 2016 Chinook Winds Open 10-Ball
 2016 Music City Classic 
 2016 Texas Open 10-Ball Championship 
 2016 Music City Classic 
 2015 Young Guns vs Old School - with (Justin Bergman) 
 2015 Carom Room Spring Classic 8-Ball
 2015 Texas Open 9-Ball Championship 
 2014 Big Tyme Classic 9-Ball
 2014 Smokin Aces Bar Box 9-Ball Open
 2014 Derby City Classic Bank Pool Ring Game

References

External links

American pool players
Living people
Sportspeople from Kentucky
1993 births
9-Ball players
People from Paducah, Kentucky
21st-century American people